Kwesi Botchwey (13 September 1942 – 19 November 2022) was a Ghanaian government official and Professor of Practice in Development Economics at The Fletcher School of Law and Diplomacy of Tufts University.

Botchwey was Minister for Finance and Economic Planning from 1982 to 1995. He was appointed by Jerry Rawlings to assist in stabilizing Ghana's collapsed economy.

Education 
Botchwey received his secondary school education at the Presbyterian Boys' Senior High School and attended St. Augustine's College. Botchwey held an LL.B. from the University of Ghana, a LL.M from Yale Law School, and a doctorate from the University of Michigan Law School. He taught at the University of Zambia, the University of Dar es Salaam (Tanzania) and the University of Ghana.

Other notable previous assignments
 Advisor to the World Bank on the 1997 World Development Report
 Member and Chairman of IMF's Group of Independent Experts who conducted the first ever external evaluation of the Enhanced Structural Adjustment Facility
 Advisor to the UNDP's UN Special Initiative on Africa
 Advisor to the European Centre for Development Policy Management (ECDPM)

Publications
Transforming the Periphery: A study of the struggle of social forces in Ghana for democracy and national sovereignty, United Nations, 1981 (ISSN 0379-5772), DSDRSCA-83/UNUO-309
"Obstacles to Centralized Reform: An African Perspective" in Laura Wallace (ed.), Deepening Structural Reform in Africa, Lessons from East Asia, Washington, DC: International Monetary Fund, 1996.
Implementing Debt Relief for the HIPCs (co-author), Center for International Development, Harvard (1999).
"Whither the Partnership Agenda in Development Cooperation: A Country perspective", 4th Conference on Evaluation and Development, World Bank (2001)
"The New Partnership for Africa's Economic Development: Internal and External Visions", NEPAD: Internal and External Visions and Influences (2003)

Later and past projects
Member and Convener Team of academics from Yale, Oxford, and the Free University of Amsterdam that conducted and has finished the first External evaluation at the request of the Executive Board of the IMF, of the Fund's Enhanced Structural Adjustment Facility (ESAF)

Member Commonwealth Group of Eminent Persons for the Facilitation of the Signing of the Uruguay Round of Gatt Negotiations.

Member OECD group of high-level experts for the review of the OECD study on "Globalization and Linkages to 2020: Challenges and Opportunities for OECD countries (1996).

Member Commonwealth Expert Group on Good Governance and the Elimination of Corruption in Economic Management

Member Panel of High Level Personalities on African Development – an advisory group established to assist the UN Secretary-General in advocating greater support for African development and in coordinating the UN system's activities in the region.

Board Chairman for Heritage bank Ghana.

Papers and speeches given at conferences
"HIV/AIDS and Economic Development in Africa", Theme Paper, African Development Forum, Economic Commission For Africa, December 2000.
"Magnitude and Drivers of the Brain Drain in Africa", Keynote Address at the 1999 Africa Business Conference, Harvard University, 30 January 1999.
"Growth and Poverty Alleviation in Africa", ODC Conference on African Economic Recovery, 1996.
"Deepening Structural Adjustment Reforms and Policies for Growth in Africa", May 1996.
"Growth and Poverty Alleviation", ODC Conference on African Economic Recovery, 11–12 June 1996.
"Globalization: What has it meant for Africa and what does the future portend?" Presented at the Seminar on International Solidarity and Globalization: In Search of New Strategies, Stockholm, 1997.
"The Role of the State, the Ministry of Finance and the Treasury Secretary in the context of Economic Liberalization and Globalization", Abidjan, June 1998.
"The Politics of Administrative Reform", World Bank, June 1998.
"Mobilizing capital flows in support of accelerated African development - the role of capital markets", Washington, DC, July 1998.

Death
Botchwey died at the Korle-Bu Teaching Hospital on 19 November 2022, at the age of 78.

References

Jeffrey, Peter Nee,  "Is Dr Kwesi Botchwey the man to lead Ghana in 2008?" GhanaWeb, 18 December 2004
 Faculty Profile of Dr Kwesi Botchwey at The Fletcher School of Law and Diplomacy

1944 births
2022 deaths
Finance ministers of Ghana
Ghanaian economists
Harvard University faculty
Presbyterian Boys' Senior High School alumni
University of Ghana alumni
Academic staff of the University of Ghana
University of Michigan Law School alumni
Academic staff of the University of Zambia
Yale Law School alumni